Logan is an unincorporated community in Clackamas County, Oregon, United States. It was named after politician and Civil War Major General John A. Logan. Its post office was established on June 13, 1884. Lafayette Hummiston(1840-1916) was its first postmaster. The office closed on October 12, 1903.

References

Unincorporated communities in Clackamas County, Oregon
1884 establishments in Oregon
Populated places established in 1884
Unincorporated communities in Oregon